Tét is a district in southern part of Győr-Moson-Sopron County. Tét is also the name of the town where the district seat is found. The district is located in the Western Transdanubia Statistical Region.

Geography 
Tét District borders with Győr District to the north and east, Pápa District (Veszprém County) to the south, Csorna District to the west. The number of the inhabited places in Tét District is 14.

Municipalities 
The district has 1 town and 13 villages.
(ordered by population, as of 1 January 2012)

The bolded municipality is the city.

Demographics

In 2011, it had a population of 14,414 and the population density was 53/km².

Ethnicity
Besides the Hungarian majority, the main minorities are the Roma (approx. 300) and German (100).

Total population (2011 census): 14,414
Ethnic groups (2011 census): Identified themselves: 13,319 persons:
Hungarians: 12,848 (96.46%)
Gypsies: 264 (1.98%)
Others and indefinable: 207 (1.55%)
Approx. 1,000 persons in Tét District did not declare their ethnic group at the 2011 census.

Religion
Religious adherence in the county according to 2011 census:

Catholic – 7,223 (Roman Catholic – 7,200; Greek Catholic – 19);
Evangelical – 2,631;
Reformed – 517;
other religions – 147; 
Non-religious – 716; 
Atheism – 49;
Undeclared – 3,131.

See also
List of cities and towns in Hungary

References

External links
 Postal codes of the Tét District

Districts in Győr-Moson-Sopron County